Krystal L. Davis, or simply Krystal Davis, is an American session musician and background singer for Herbie Mann, Evelyn King and Cyndi Lauper.

Her single "So Smooth"  was released in 1985 and peaked at number nine on the Billboard Hot Dance Singles Sales chart, staying there for 12 weeks.

Biography
Her musical career began with the 1977 production titled The Atlantic Family Live at Montreux. 
She afterwards provided vocals for various jazz and disco musicians such as Dazzle, Maynard Ferguson, Herbie Mann or Inner Life and throughout the 1980s, Cyndi Lauper, Change and Melba Moore.

In 1988 she co-wrote a song with Luther Vandross called "So Much Better Now" for Gregory Hines.

Together with New York City-based R&B band called Blyss she recorded "No Turning Back". Although not charted, it was picked by Billboard as a "recommended" piece of urban music.

Davis also had a minor role in the Matty Rich movie Straight Out of Brooklyn.

Chart performance

Discography

Particular singles
"So Smooth"

References

External links
 Krystal Davis – Credits at Discogs.

Year of birth missing (living people)
Living people
American film actresses
Women new wave singers
American dance musicians
American boogie musicians
American women singers
Synth-pop singers
21st-century American women
Change (band) members